Discos Fuentes is a record label based in Medellín, Colombia, South America. Founded in 1934 in Cartagena, Colombia, by Antonio Fuentes Estrada, Discos Fuentes was the country's first notable record label. The label was instrumental in introducing Colombia to such Afro-rhythm genres as cumbia, fandango, merengue, porro, and salsa. The label also helped forge the early careers for such musicians and composers as Guillermo Buitrago, Rafael Escalona, and Julio César Bovea.

Discos Fuentes has often been described as Colombia's version of "Motown", peaking in the 1960s and early 1970s. The label achieved a series of firsts for Colombia: the first compilation album (1960) and the first Compact Disc release (1987).

After the death of the label's founder, Antonio Fuentes Estrada, in 1985, the company expanded into video production and purchased several other music labels, including Discos Tropical and Curro.

US distribution
In the United States, the manufacture and/or distribution of Discos Fuentes releases was eventually handled by Miami Records, a Miami, Florida-based label specializing in Latin American music. Formed in 1950 by Colombian immigrant, Carlos Diaz-Granados, Sr., Miami Records also managed the manufacture and/or distribution of Latin music for other South American labels as well as for such American labels as Columbia Records.

Select artists

References

External links
Official website

Record labels established in 1934
Colombian record labels
1934 establishments in Colombia